Types and Programming Languages, is a book by Benjamin C. Pierce on type systems published in 2002. 

A review by Frank Pfenning called it "probably the single most important book in the area of programming languages in recent years."

References

External links

Computer science books